Paul Reuter, a native of St. Louis, is an American composer. He received his Master of Arts in Music Composition from the University of Missouri. His compositions have been performed by the St. Louis Symphony Orchestra, the University City Symphony Orchestra, and others. His works have been broadcast on National Public Radio, American Public Radio, and the BBC. He is currently the Executive Director of the Sheldon Concert Hall.

Selected works
 Variations on Vivaldi's Guitar Concerto - guitar and orchestra
 1492 Overture - guitar and orchestra
 Four Saints - chamber orchestra
 We Have a Dream - children's choir and orchestra
 Sojourner Truth - actress and chamber ensemble
 Love Will Never Die - Trumpet, Organ, Vocals

References

External links
The Sheldon Newsletter July 30, 2009

20th-century classical composers
American male classical composers
American classical composers
University of Missouri alumni
Living people
20th-century American composers
20th-century American male musicians
Year of birth missing (living people)